Kachi Pul is a small town in Qubo Saeed Khan, Kamber Shahdadkot Sindh, Pakistan, situated near the border of Sindh and Balochistan at the distance of 1/2 km from Ratodero Guader Motorway (M-8) and 7 km from Qubo Saeed Khan town.  

The town links Balouchistan and Sindh.

External links
 Daily-Kawish 30 June
 Flood Information
 School  information in Kachi Pul

References

Populated places in Sindh